The Central and East European Center for Cognitive Science (also as CEEC of Cognitive Science ) at the New Bulgarian University undertakes research in fundamental and applied cognitive science. Research topics include: memory, thinking, language, learning, perception, context, applications to robotics, AI, and cognitive systems, cognitive economics, human factors and usability, education and learning methods. The center is co-directed by Boicho Kokinov and Jeff Elman.

The CEEC of Cognitive Science grants M.Sc., Ph.D. degrees  in cognitive science and organizes annually summer school.

References

External links
 Page @ NBU site

New Bulgarian University